Isaac Davis may refer to:

Isaac Davis (soldier) (1745–1775), Revolutionary War Minuteman captain
Isaac Davis (advisor) (1758–1810), Welsh advisor to Kamehameha I
Isaac Davis (lawyer) (1799–1883), lawyer active in Worcester, Massachusetts
Isaac Davis (American football) (born 1972), American football player
Ike Davis (born 1987), American baseball first baseman
Ike Davis (shortstop) (1895–1984), American baseball shortstop
Isaac Mortimer Davis, the protagonist of Woody Allen's 1979 film Manhattan

See also
Isaac Davis Trail, historic trail in Massachusetts, United States
Isaac Davis House, historic house in Massachusetts, United States
David Isaacs (disambiguation)